The 2007 Legg Mason Tennis Classic was the 38th edition of this tennis tournament and was played on outdoor hard courts.  The tournament was part of the International Series of the 2007 ATP Tour. It was held at the William H.G. FitzGerald Tennis Center in Washington, D.C. from July 30 through August 6, 2007.

Finals

Singles

 Andy Roddick defeated  John Isner, 6–4, 7–6(7–4)
It was Roddick's 2nd title of the year and the 23rd of his career. It was his 3rd title at the event, also winning in 2001 and 2005.

Doubles

 Bob Bryan /  Mike Bryan defeated  Jonathan Erlich /  Andy Ram, 7–6(7–5), 3–6, [10–7]

References

External links
 ATP tournament profile

Legg Mason
Washington Open (tennis)
Legg Mason Tennis Classic
2007 in Washington, D.C.